Mexhit Haxhiu (born 3 January 1943) is an Albanian former footballer who played for Flamurtari Vlorë, Partizani Tirana and Besa Kavajë, as well as the Albania national team. He is currently the 19th top goalscorer in Albanian history with 87 league goals, 77 of which he scored for Flamurtari Vlorë and 10 for Partizani Tirana.

Club career
In his youth, Haxhiu played schoolboy football and also represented his hometown Vlorë in basketball and free-style swimming. He started with local side Flamurtari's youth team in 1959 and in 1963 he was summoned to Partizani to fulfil his military service. He was allowed to return to Flamurtari in 1966, but did not play for a year after the Sigurimi accused him to be son of a foreign agent (his father Dalip fled the country in 1944) and he was subsequently prohibited to play for neither the national team, a team from Tirana nor the army team (Partizani) ever again. Injury made him finish his career in 1976 at 33 years of age, scoring a total of 166 goals for Flamurtari.

International career
He made his debut for Albania in an October 1964 friendly match against Algeria and earned a total of 3 caps, scoring 1 goal. His final international was a November 1965 FIFA World Cup qualification match against Northern Ireland, since he was not allowed in the national team by the communist leaders from 1966.

Managerial career
He later coached at Flamurtari and Bylis as well as the national team under-16. In December 2014 he was appointed director of the Flamurtari Vlorë youth academy.

Personal life
Haxhiu is married to Fathbarda and they have two sons, Saimir and Gertin.

The defection of his father in December 1944 had much impact on his life and football career and he would only meet his father again after 47 years in Paris in March 1991, after the infamous European qualification match away against France, when many players then also defected to Western Europe. They met again on his father's return to Albania only in September 1992 and Dalip died in December 1993. In 2015, Haxhiu published his biography called Katroni i Kuq (Red Card).

Honours
Albanian Superliga: 1
 1964

Albanian Cup: 1
 1966

References

External links

1943 births
Living people
Footballers from Vlorë
Albanian footballers
Association football forwards
Albania international footballers
Flamurtari Vlorë players
FK Partizani Tirana players
Besa Kavajë players
Kategoria Superiore players